"Good Luck My Way" is the thirty-eighth single, and first 20th L'Anniversary's single, by L'Arc-en-Ciel, released on June 29, 2011. It was used as the closing theme song of Fullmetal Alchemist: The Sacred Star of Milos. Released in three different editions; a standard, a limited, which came with a DVD of "Good Luck My Way" music clip compilation, and a "Fullmetal Alchemist". The later version contains; all of L'Arc-en-Ciel's songs that were used for the franchise, and a DVD of "Good Luck My Way" music clip "Fullmetal Alchemist" version compilation and Fullmetal Alchemist: The Sacred Star of Milos theatrical version and TV spot (all 7 versions).

Track listing

References 

2011 singles
2011 songs
L'Arc-en-Ciel songs
Fullmetal Alchemist songs
Japanese film songs
Songs written for animated films
Songs written by Hyde (musician)
Songs written by Tetsuya (musician)